Chris White (July 6, 1936 − November 2, 2014) was an American jazz bassist.

Early life and education
Christopher Wesley White was born in Harlem, New York, and grew up in Brooklyn. He graduated in 1956 from City College of New York, and in 1968 from the Manhattan School of Music. In 1974, he earned his Master of Education from the University of Massachusetts Amherst. In 1994, he did postgraduate Advanced Computer Study at Berklee College of Music.

Career
White was an occasional member of Cecil Taylor's band in the 1950s, credited on the 1959 Love for Sale album. From 1960 to 1961 he accompanied Nina Simone; subsequently he was a member of Dizzy Gillespie's ensemble until 1966.

He later founded the band The Jazz Survivors and was a member of the band Prism. In addition to this, he collaborated with Billy Taylor, Eubie Blake, Earl Hines, Chick Corea, Teddy Wilson, Kenny Barron, Mary Lou Williams, Duke Ellington, Sarah Vaughan, Carmen McRae and Billy Cobham.

White was on the creative arts and technology faculty at Bloomfield College in New Jersey.

Awards
1993-94 Bloomfield College, Award Of Acknowledgment
1990, 1984, 1982 National Endowment for the Arts, Inter-Arts Program, Jazz Composition
1990 New Jersey State Council On The Arts, Fellowship, Jazz
1979 Consortium Of Jazz Organizations And Artists, Outstanding Musicianship Award
1976 Professor Of The Year, Rutger's Newark Jazz Society
1968 Record World, New Star Best Jazz Bassist (Winner)
1963 Playboy Reader's Poll, Best Jazz Bassist (4th Place)
1961-64 Downbeat Reader's Poll, Best Bassist (3rd & 4th place)

Discography

As leader
The Chris White Project (Muse) with Cassandra Wilson (vocals); Marvin Horne, Jimmy Ponder (guitar); Grachan Moncur III (trombone); Michael Raye (synthesizer); Steve Nelson (vibraphone); Keith Copeland (drums); Steve Kroon (percussion)
Interface recorded 2010 Lou Caputo/Chris White  co leaders with Warren Smith Vibs Payton Crosley Drums  Don Stein piano Leopoldo Fleming percussion

As sideman
With Kenny Barron
You Had Better Listen (Atlantic, 1967) with Jimmy Owens
Lucifer (Muse, 1975)
With Nina Simone
Nina Simone at Newport (Colpix, 1960)
With Dizzy Gillespie
The New Continent (Limelight, 1962)
Dizzy Gillespie and the Double Six of Paris (Philips, 1963)
Jambo Caribe (Limelight, 1964)
I/We Had a Ball (Limelight, 1965) - 1 track
With Ramsey Lewis
Barefoot Sunday Blues (Argo, 1963)
With James Moody
Comin' On Strong (Argo, 1963)
With Jimmy Owens
Jimmy Owens (A&M/Horizon, 1976)
Headin' Home (A&M/Horizon, 1978)
With Dave Pike
Bossa Nova Carnival (New Jazz, 1962)
With Lalo Schifrin
Bossa Nova: New Brazilian Jazz (Audio Fidelity, 1962)
Piano, Strings and Bossa Nova (MGM, 1962)
With Quincy Jones
Big Band Bossa Nova (Mercury, 1962)

References

External links

1936 births
2014 deaths
People from Harlem
American jazz double-bassists
Male double-bassists
Record producers from New York (state)
City College of New York alumni
Manhattan School of Music alumni
University of Massachusetts Amherst College of Education alumni
Berklee College of Music alumni
Muse Records artists
Jazz musicians from New York (state)
American male jazz musicians